Sally J. Novetzke (born January 12, 1932) is an American political aide who served as the United States Ambassador to Malta from 1989 to 1993.

When George H.W. Bush was campaigning for Ronald Reagan in 1979 in Iowa, he met Novetzke for the first time.  The next day, she was asked to be the Linn County chairwoman.  When Bush was elected President in 1988, he asked her to be Ambassador.  She was in charge of the team that coordinated the Malta Summit between Bush and Mikhail Gorbachev.

References

1932 births
Living people
Ambassadors of the United States to Malta
Iowa Republicans
American women ambassadors
People from Cedar Rapids, Iowa
21st-century American women